Segovia Formation may refer to:
 Segovia Formation, Texas, Cretaceous geologic formation of Texas
 Segovia Formation, Colombia, Lower Cretaceous geologic formation of Colombia